Chippewa County is a county in the U.S. state of Minnesota. As of the 2020 census, the population was 12,598. Its county seat is Montevideo. The county was formed in 1862, and was organized in 1868.

History 
Chippewa County was organized on March 5, 1868, after having been part of Renville County. The northern boundary change separating it from Swift County led to reorganization on February 18, 1870. The first three county commissioners, appointed by the governor, were Daniel S. Wilkins, Ole Thorson and M. Davidson. The county commissioners first met at Wilkins's cabin on January 9, 1869. Wilkins was appointed chairman of the board. The first officers appointed were J.D Baker as auditor; J.C. Eldred as register of deeds; Samuel J. Sargant as treasurer; George W. Daniels as judge of probate; Edward Alcorn as sheriff; J.D. Baker as superintendent of schools; Horace W. Griggs as coroner; George W. Frink as justice of the peace; and F.W. Palmer and M. Morris as constables.

County seat 
Chippewa City was the first village to be laid out in Chippewa County. It was on the west side of the Chippewa River, just north of the confluence with the Minnesota River. Daniel S. Wilkins was the first settler to arrive in 1865, and he laid out Chippewa City in autumn 1868. Wilkins's cabin there was the location of the first county commissioners' meeting. 

George W. Frink arrived in Chippewa County in 1867 and made claim to land on the east side of the Chippewa River, where he built a log house in Montevideo. With towns on both sides of the river, there was debate over which should be the county seat. L. R. Moyer reported that some men from Montevideo went to Chippewa City and took the county records, "lock, stock and barrel". They also stole the post office, and G. W. Fink was named postmaster. The state of Minnesota legalized the move and Montevideo remains the county seat.

Geography 

The upper part of the county's western boundary is formed by the outline of Lac qui Parle reservoir, which was formed when the Minnesota River was dammed in 1939. The Minnesota River flows southeast from the lake, along the county's southwestern border, while the Chippewa River flows south through the western part of the county to discharge into the Minnesota at the county's southern border. The Dry Weather Creek drains the west-central part of the county into the Chippewa, while the Palmer Creek drains the lower central part of the county into the Minnesota near the county's southernmost point. The county terrain consists of low rolling hills, devoted to agriculture. The terrain generally slopes to the south, and locally to the river valleys.

Lakes

 Carlton Lake
 Long Lake
 Norboro Lake
 Round Lake
 Shakopee Lake
 Watson Sag

Major highways

  U.S. Highway 59
  U.S. Highway 212
  Minnesota State Highway 7
  Minnesota State Highway 23
  Minnesota State Highway 29
  Minnesota State Highway 40

Adjacent counties

 Swift County - north
 Kandiyohi County - northeast
 Renville County - southeast
 Yellow Medicine County - southwest
 Lac qui Parle County - west

Protected areas

 Boike State Wildlife Management Area
 Franko State Wildlife Management Area
 Gneiss Outcrops Scientific and Natural Area
 Minnesota River Valley Overlook
 Spartan State Wildlife Management Area

Climate and weather

Demographics

2000 census
As of the 2000 census, there were 13,088 people, 5,361 households, and 3,597 families in the county. The population density was 22.5/sqmi (8.70/km2). There were 5,855 housing units at an average density of 10.1/sqmi (3.89/km2). The racial makeup of the county was 96.78% White, 0.18% Black or African American, 1.00% Native American, 0.30% Asian, 0.02% Pacific Islander, 0.94% from other races, and 0.79% from two or more races. 1.92% of the population were Hispanic or Latino of any race. 37.8% were of Norwegian and 36.8% German ancestry.

There were 5,361 households, out of which 31.20% had children under the age of 18 living with them, 57.00% were married couples living together, 6.60% had a female householder with no husband present, and 32.90% were non-families. 29.50% of all households were made up of individuals, and 15.70% had someone living alone who was 65 years of age or older. The average household size was 2.39 and the average family size was 2.96.

The county population contained 25.40% under the age of 18, 7.10% from 18 to 24, 24.50% from 25 to 44, 23.00% from 45 to 64, and 20.00% who were 65 years of age or older. The median age was 40 years. For every 100 females there were 94.80 males. For every 100 females age 18 and over, there were 91.30 males.

The median income for a household in the county was $35,582, and the median income for a family was $45,160. Males had a median income of $30,556 versus $20,384 for females. The per capita income for the county was $18,039. About 4.80% of families and 8.60% of the population were below the poverty line, including 9.80% of those under age 18 and 9.30% of those age 65 or over.

2020 Census

Communities

Cities

 Clara City
 Granite Falls (partial)
 Maynard
 Milan
 Montevideo (county seat)
 Watson

Unincorporated communities

 Asbury
 Big Bend City
 Bunde
 Churchill
 Gracelock
 Gluek
 Hagan
 Louriston
 Wegdahl

Townships

 Big Bend Township
 Crate Township
 Grace Township
 Granite Falls Township
 Havelock Township
 Kragero Township
 Leenthrop Township
 Lone Tree Township
 Louriston Township
 Mandt Township
 Rheiderland Township
 Rosewood Township
 Sparta Township
 Stoneham Township
 Tunsberg Township
 Woods Township

Government and politics
Chippewa County voters have tended to vote Democratic in recent decades. As of 2020 the county has selected the Democratic nominee in 67% of presidential elections since 1980. Donald Trump was the first Republican nominee to win the county since George W. Bush in 2000, receiving 60.5% of the vote.

See also
 National Register of Historic Places listings in Chippewa County, Minnesota

References

External links
 Chippewa County government's website

 
Minnesota counties
Minnesota placenames of Native American origin
1868 establishments in Minnesota
Populated places established in 1868